Hugo Turner FRGS and Ross Turner FRGS (born 22 October 1988), better known as The Turner Twins, are British adventurers best known for their pioneering expeditions.

Biography
The twins were born in Exeter and grew up near Christow in Devon. 
 

They both graduated with degrees in industrial design and technology from Loughborough University in 2011.

They hold two world records: for being part of the youngest four-man crew to row the Atlantic and the first twins to row any of the world's oceans, after successfully rowing the Atlantic Ocean in 2011–12 as part of the Talisker Whisky Atlantic Challenge.

Hugo broke his neck aged 17, resulting in a neck reconstruction. Following this accident the twins have supported spinal research charities.

During their expeditions, the twins support and actively take part in medical research studies at King's College London's Department of Twin Research. They are also known as the "Adventure Guinea Pigs".

They have climbed Mt Elbrus allowing King’s College London’s, Department of Twin Research and GlaxoSmithKline’s, Human Performance Lab to conduct research to better understand the effects of high altitude on the human body and the performance of different clothing systems by having one twin wear the replica clothing from George Mallory’s 1924 Everest expedition and the other wear today’s modern mountaineering equivalent.

They have reached several centre points known as poles of inaccessibility.

Expeditions

Atlantic row
In 2011, Hugo and Ross rowed across the Atlantic Ocean with teammates Adam Wolley and Greg Symondson. Starting on the island of La Gomera in the Canary Islands, they rowed to the Caribbean island of Barbados, arriving at Port St Charles 41 days, 23 hours, 34 minutes later, setting two world records – the youngest four-man crew and the first twins to have rowed across any of the world's oceans.  Along the route they battled 40 foot seas, lightning storms, fatigue, jelly fish stings, swollen prostates, hallucinations, salt sores, limited sleep and sea sickness.

Greenland ice cap
In 2014, the twins attempted to trek across the polar ice cap of Greenland. The expedition set out to support research programs at King's College London's Department of Twin Research while also comparing old and new clothing – Ross wore replica clothing which Sir Ernest Shackleton used 100 years ago on his "Endurance" expedition, while Hugo used modern clothing. The 555km trek had the twins dragging 100kg sledges, skirting crevasses and avoiding teetering 6m ice structures. Hugo sustained a knee injury which resulted in a helicopter evacuation after two weeks.

Mt Elbrus
In 2015, the twins climbed Mt Elbrus in the Caucasus mountain range. The twins tested the traditional clothing and equipment used by mountaineers 100 years ago and compared it against today's modern mountaineering equivalent.

Australian pole of inaccessibility
In 2016, the twins reached one of the centre points of Australia, otherwise known as the Australian pole of inaccessibility, using paramotors. Adventurers have journeyed to the pole before, but never by paramotor. Having had 6 months worth of training and learning to experience heights of 500-1000 feet, the twins started near Adelaide and eventually reached an area of Australia known as the Red Centre near the town of Papunya.

South American pole of inaccessibility 
In 2017, the twins reached the South American pole of inaccessibility. Starting from the Chilean coastal town of Arica, they cycled across Bolivia into the Brazilian state of Mato Grosso near the city of Cuiabá. They achieved this expedition on bike and cycled 2500km and taking a time of 5 weeks. They experienced four very different environments: desert, high-altitude plateau, jungle and Brazil with 45-degree heat.

North American pole of inaccessibility 
In September 2018, the twins successfully reached the North American pole of inaccessibility using bicycles. Covering a distance of 2600km and temperatures ranging between 51 Celsius to -5 Celsius this expedition took them 4 weeks. Starting from Los Angeles, the route crossed the Mojave Desert, Monument Valley, Grand Canyon, Rocky Mountains, Grasslands and eventually the Badlands National Park.

Iberian pole of inaccessibility
In 2019 the twins successfully reached the Iberian pole carrying out a fully electric motorcycle expedition. Their mission was to discover the capabilities of fully electric vehicles. Beginning in central London, the route journeyed across France, over the Pyrenees and into central Spain. Covering a total distance of 2,534 kms, it took 7 days to reach the Pole of Inaccessibility with the motorcycles requiring 59 hours of charging.

Atlantic pole of inaccessibility
In 2022 the twins set out to reach the Atlantic pole of inaccessibility, supporting a plastic research survey for Plymouth University's, International Marine Litter Research Unit, and also testing hydrogen fuel cell technology in a subsequent nationwide tour of the UK. The team missed out on reaching the pole of inaccessibility due to unfavourable weather and engine limitations.

Medical research
The twins work with King's College London's Department of Twin Research to help better understand the genetic and physical make-up. During their various expeditions, the medical research conducted on the twins has focused on a number of key areas, including the gut microbiome, cortisol levels and daily fasting blood glucose levels.

Vegan versus meat diets
The Twins embarked on a trial of a vegan diet versus a typical omnivorous one, with their body composition monitored and their biomarkers tested by King’s College London’s Department of Twin Research. Outcomes recorded were that on the vegan diet the cholesterol level went down of Hugo but the meat diet of Ross remained high. Energy levels whilst training were better and maintained for longer on the vegan diet. Along with higher fat loss and longer satiated glucose levels using continuous glucose monitors to test this finding.

Filmography
Television

References

External links
 Official website

1988 births
Living people
British explorers
People from Teignbridge (district)
English twins
Twin studies
People educated at King's College, Taunton
Alumni of Loughborough University
British motivational speakers